Appointment With His Majesty is a studio album by the Jamaican reggae singer Burning Spear. It was nominated for a Grammy Award for Best Reggae Album at the 40th Grammy Awards, in 1998.

The album peaked at No. 10 on Billboard'''s Reggae Albums chart.

Production
The title track is thought to be a polemic about the rise of dancehall music. "Play Jerry" is a tribute to Jerry Garcia.

Critical receptionThe Washington Post wrote that "the reggae ... is typically swirling and hypnotic, but this is first and foremost message music." The Boston Globe thought that "the formula is simple: mesmerizing bass lines, snappy horns and Spear's own time-worn voice, reflecting conscious themes and Pan-African concerns." Stereo Review'' concluded that Spear "remains a quietly persuasive singer with often overlooked knacks for melody and topical bite; 'Commercial Development' and 'Don't Sell Out' strike back at the industrialization of both Jamaica and reggae."

Track listing
All songs written and arranged by Winston Rodney.

"The Future (Clean It Up)" – 4:47
"Appointment With His  Majesty" – 4:20
"Play Jerry" – 4:39
"Reggae Physician" – 4:25
"Glory Be to Jah" – 5:04
"Don't Sell Out" – 4:33
"Come in Peace" – 4:23
"African Jamaican" – 5:02
"My Island" – 4:54
"Commercial Development" – 5:21
"Music" – 4:54
"Loving You" – 4:57

Credits

Published by Burning Spear Publishing, ASCAP.
Executive Producer - Sonia Rodney
Recorded at Grove Recording Studio, Ocho Rios, St. Ann's.
Edited by Barry O'Hare
Mixed By Barry O'Hare and Winston Rodney.
Assistant Engineer - Bobby Hawthorne
Project Coordinator for Heartbeat - Garret Vandermolen
Sequencing - Chris Wilson
Mastered by Dr. Toby Mountain at Northeastern Digital Recording, Southborough, MA.
Photography by Dana Siles
Design by Jean-Pierre LeGuillou

Musicians
Winston Rodney - vocals, congas, percussion, background vocals
Nelson Miller - drums
James Smith - trumpet
Lenval Jarrett - rhythm guitar
Num H.S. Amun’Tehu - percussion, background vocals
Steven Stewart - keyboards
Rupert Bent - lead guitar
Ronald "Nambo" Robinson - trombone
Howard Messam - saxophone
Barry O'Hare - keyboard
Carol "Passion" Nelson - background vocals
Edna Rodney - background vocals
Rachell Bradshaw - background vocals
Yvonne Patrick - background vocals
Sharon Gordon - background vocals
Additional Musicians
Tony Williams - drums
Trevor McKenzie - bass
Collin Elliot - bass
Robbie Lyn - keyboard, background vocals
Ian "Beezy" Coleman - rhythm, lead guitar ("Play Jerry")
Junior "Chico" Chin - trumpet ("Play Jerry")
Uziah "Sticky" Thompson - percussion ("Play Jerry")
Tony Green - saxophone ("Play Jerry")

References

Burning Spear albums
1997 albums